Lech am Arlberg is a mountain village and an exclusive ski resort in the Bludenz district in the westernmost Austrian state of Vorarlberg, on the banks of the river Lech.

In terms of both geography and history, Lech belongs to the Tannberg district. In touristic terms, however, it is part of the Arlberg region. Lech is administered together with the neighbouring villages of Zürs, Zug, Oberlech and Stubenbach. The municipality is an internationally known winter sports resort on the Arlberg mountain range and caters to wealthier clientele, particularly to the international jet set and foreign royalty. The Dutch royal family and Russian oligarchs regularly ski there. Lech am Arlberg is one of the 12 members of the elite group "Best of the Alps".

History
Lech was settled and founded in the first half of the 14th century by Walser migrants from the canton of Wallis in Switzerland. Until the nineteenth century, it was known as "Tannberg". Subsequently, the full name "Tannberg am Lech" gave rise to the present name "Lech".

The church of St Nicholas, which is thought to have been built around 1390, was the parish church of the Tannberg administrative district, and there was also a Tannberg district court in Lech until the dissolution of the Tannberg district in 1806.

In recent decades, the once small town has developed into a flourishing community, thanks to the influence of winter tourism and, increasingly, by summer tourism.

Population

Climate
Lech has a subarctic climate, bordering on a humid continental climate with cold winters and cool summers. The heavy snows which fall in winter make Lech a sought-after ski resort.

Ski centre
In recent years Lech has grown to become one of the world's prime ski destinations and the home of a number of world and Olympic ski champions.

Lech is best known for its skiing (both on-piste and off-piste). It is well-networked via mechanical lifts and well-groomed pistes with the neighbouring villages of Zürs, St. Christoph, St. Anton, Stuben, Warth, and Schröcken. All these villages are located in the Arlberg region, the birthplace of the modern Alpine skiing and the seat of the Ski Club Arlberg. It is one of the most extensive connected ski areas in Austria and one of the largest in Europe.

Lech is also the starting and finishing point for The White Ring, a circle of runs and lifts that is a popular tour and the scene of an annual race involving 1,000 participating ski racers. With its 22 km, it is considered the longest ski circuit in the world.

The mountain holiday scenes in the movie Bridget Jones: The Edge of Reason were shot in Lech.

FIS Alpine World Ski Championships
The ski area Lech-Zürs has been the venue for numerous FIS Alpine World Ski Championship races in the past, including the following:

 January 1988: super-G (women), winner: Zoe Haas (SUI)
 November 1991: 2 slalom races (women), winners: Vreni Schneider (SUI) and Bianca Fernández Ochoa (SPA)
 January 1993: slalom (men), winner: Thomas Fogdö (SWE)
 January 1993: combination (men), winner: Marc Girardelli (LUX)
 December 1993: super-G (men), winner: Hannes Trinkl (AUT)
 December 1994: 2 slalom races (men), winner: Alberto Tomba (IT)

After a pause of 26 years, alpine ski races will be held again in Lech in November 2020. The races, consisting of parallel ski races for men and women, as well as a mixed team event, will take place on November 14 and 15 in the Flexenarena Zürs.

Culture

Cultural sites

Although not as well-frequented in the summer as it is in the winter, Lech nevertheless has sporting, cultural, culinary, and other activities. There are many premier hotels in Lech, as well as numerous top class restaurants.

One former well-known visitor was the writer Ludwig Bemelmans (author of the Madeline books), whose 1949 novel The Eye of God was set in a fictionalised Lech.

Lech has a number of points of cultural interest, including:

 the church of St Nicholas, which was built in the Gothic style around 1390, and extensively renovated in 1987. Particular features are the Rococo interior dating from 1791 (although there are some earlier Romanesque frescoes); the 33-metre-high tower with its distinctive onion-shaped dome; and bronze bells, the oldest of which dates from the beginning of the sixteenth century,
 the historic Huber House, now a museum, was built in 1590; it displays examples of the earlier way of life and work in the region, with a traditional kitchen and workshop,
 "Horizon-Fields": life-sized human sculptures by the sculptor Antony Gormley, which were placed in the mountains surrounding Lech.  Originally numbering 100, most were removed in April 2012,
 The Green Ring: a three-day tour around Lech-Zürs in Vorarlberg, in which a person well-versed in local literature serves as a hiking guide. Along the trail there are 35 art installations dealing with local people, culture and stories. This was originally a LEADER-Project, carried out by the two artists Daniela Egger and Daniel Kocher. The art and literature project "The Green Ring" will be continuously and sustainably expanded and extended in the coming years,
The Skyspace Lech is an art installation by James Turrell. A skyspace is an enclosed space which is open to the sky through a large hole in the ceiling. Visitors gaze at the changing light colors on the walls, and at the sky during sunrise and sunset. It was opened in 2018.

Regular events 

The White Ring (Der Weiße Ring) is the longest ski race in the world, according to Guinness Book of Records. 5,500 metres altitude, 22 kilometres of ski runs. Ski pioneer Sepp Bildstein was the initiator of the White Ring, the ski resort that has connected the villages of Lech, Zürs, Zug and Oberlech for over 50 years. In 1940, the first ski lift was built on the White Ring, thus laying the foundations for a legendary skiing holiday resort. In addition to 22 kilometres of ski runs, the winter sports enthusiast have a unique mountain backdrop, also thanks to viewing platforms and art installations. The first race at the White Ring was held in 2006 for the 50th anniversary of the ski resort. The course record is 44:10:75 minutes and has been held since 2010 by Markus Weiskopf.
Philosophicum Lech: The Philosophicum Lech is a philosophical symposium on philosophical, cultural and social science reflection, discussion and encounter. The well-endowed Tractatus prize is awarded to the best scientific essay.
Medicinicum Lech: A public health event that deals with topics related to health and nutrition.
Arlberg Classic Car Rally: In 2017, for the eighth time, 120 classic cars from 1908 to 1973 went on tour between Arlberg and Zugspitze for three days, as a rolling museum. In memory of the great achievements of the former road builders, the beginning of the really leads from Lech down through the Flexenpassgalerie to Stuben and finally to Wald am Arlberg. The route between Lech and Zürs was opened in 1897 and is regarded as a technical masterpiece.

Notable people

Natives 
 Gerhard Nenning (1940-1995), alpine ski racer

Residents 
Trudi Beiser, 1940s and 1950s Olympic skiing champion and world skiing champion
Othmar Schneider, 1950s Olympic skiing champion
Egon Zimmermann, 1960s Olympic skiing champion and world skiing champion
Patrick Ortlieb, 1990s Olympic skiing champion and world skiing champion

Sister cities
 Beaver Creek Resort, Avon, Colorado, United States of America
 Kampen, Sylt, Germany
 Hakuba, Happo, Japan

In fiction

Lech is at the location of the fictitious thriller An Exchange of Eagles by Owen Sela, in which a group of German and American conspirators tries to assassinate Adolf Hitler during the dictator's stay at the resort in 1940.

The action in the detective novel Crossed Skis - An Alpine Mystery by Carol Carnac, who also wrote as E. C. R. Lorac, takes place in London and Lech, with a party of English skiers. First published in 1952, it was republished in 2020 as part of the British Library Crime Classics series.

Lech was one of the filming locations of the 2004 movie Bridget Jones: The Edge of Reason, with Renée Zellweger.

References

External links

Official website of Lech-Zürs
Official website of the municipality Lech am Arlberg
Official Panoramic virtual tours of Lech
Postcards from Lech

Skiing in Austria
Ski areas and resorts in Austria
Tourist attractions in Vorarlberg
Cities and towns in Bludenz District
Vorarlberg